Nematus tibialis, known generally as the locust sawfly or false acacia sawfly, is a species of common sawfly in the family Tenthredinidae.

References

Further reading

External links

 

Tenthredinidae
Insects described in 1837